Mohd Latif Sapup (born 25 September 1963) is a former Malaysian professional darts player.

Career
In 2009 Sapup lost in the final of the Malaysian Open to Joseph Clairines.
He qualified for the 2013 PDC World Darts Championship after coming through the South Asian qualifier, but was beaten 4–1 in the preliminary round by Singapore's Paul Lim.

He qualified for the World Championship again for the 2014 edition after defeating compatriot Kesava Rao to win the South Asian qualifier. He missed numerous chances to win the first two legs, but did take out a 141 finish to stay in the match, however this was the only double he hit out of ten attempts as he lost to Devon Petersen 4–1.

World Championship results

PDC
 2013: Last 72 (lost to Paul Lim 1–4) (legs)
 2014: Last 72 (lost to Devon Petersen 1–4)

References

External links

Living people
1963 births
Malaysian darts players
Professional Darts Corporation associate players